Laterallus is a genus of birds in the rail family Rallidae. These small, relatively short-billed terrestrial rails are found among dense vegetation near water in the Neotropics, although a single species, the black rail, also occurs in the United States.

The genus was erected by the English zoologist George Robert Gray in 1855 with the rufous-sided crake (Laterallus melanophaius) as the type species. The genus name is a portmanteau of Rallus lateralis, a synonym of the binomial name for the rufous-sided crake. The authors of a molecular genetic study published in 2019 proposed that the yellow-breasted crake, the dot-winged crake, and the flightless Inaccessible Island rail should be moved to this genus.

Species
The genus contains 13 species:
Black-banded crake, Laterallus fasciatus
Rufous-sided crake, Laterallus melanophaius
Rusty-flanked crake, Laterallus levraudi
Ruddy crake, Laterallus ruber
White-throated crake, Laterallus albigularis
Grey-breasted crake, Laterallus exilis
Yellow-breasted crake, Laterallus flaviventer
Black rail, Laterallus jamaicensis
Junin crake, Laterallus jamaicensis tuerosi
Galapagos crake, Laterallus spilonota
Dot-winged crake, Laterallus spiloptera
Inaccessible Island rail, Laterallus rogersi
Red-and-white crake, Laterallus leucopyrrhus
Rufous-faced crake, Laterallus xenopterus

References

Taylor, B., & van Perlo, B. (1998). Rails – A Guide to the Rails, Crakes, Gallinules and Coots of the World. 

 
Bird genera

Taxa named by George Robert Gray